Oceanic Airlines, and less frequently, Oceanic Airways, is the name of a fictional airline used in several films, television programs, and comic books—typically works that feature plane crashes and other aviation disasters, with which a real airline would prefer not to be associated.

The brand is used prominently in the TV series Lost, where Oceanic Airlines is featured branded with a highly stylized logo depicting an Australian Aboriginal dot painting that resembles a nazar, a bullseye, an island, or an "O". The show's fictional storyline begins with the crash of an airline flight called Oceanic Flight 815.

Airlines with this name have also been featured in other media, starting as early as the 1960s. Before Lost, the most prominent use of Oceanic Airlines was in the 1996 film Executive Decision. The film's producers shot extensive footage of two actual Boeing 747s with Oceanic Airlines logo and livery, though not the same logo used later on Lost. This stock footage has been reused in several films and television programs, spreading the Oceanic Airlines brand across various otherwise unrelated fictional universes.

Appearances 

The following sources feature an airline called Oceanic Airlines.

Lost 

Oceanic Airlines is a central plot element in the TV series Lost. The show explores the aftermath of the crash of Oceanic Flight 815 (a Lockheed L-1011 was used to create the crash, but the plane in-universe is stated as a Boeing 777) traveling from Sydney to Los Angeles. The producers of Lost also created a now-defunct website for the fictional airline, including clues and references to the show's plot. In flashforwards, a group of characters who survive the crash (Hurley, Kate, Jack, Sayid, Sun, and Aaron) are nicknamed the "Oceanic Six." In January 2008, viral marketing billboards for Oceanic Airlines were placed by ABC in various large cities around the world as part of the Find 815 alternate reality game. Fictitious TV advertisements for the company also aired on ABC and the internet, including one advertisement that apparently airs in an alternate universe where flight 815 did not crash and Oceanic has a "perfect safety record". The flight number 815 is a nod to Disney's Peter Pan animation: while flying into the Big Ben clock dial, Peter Pan sets the time to 8:15. This reference later shows up in Once Upon a Time.

Other media

Apps and Internet 
 Apple iPhone OS 3.0 launch (17 March 2009): While demonstrating cut and paste features on the iPhone 3G, Scott Forstall is seen creating an email which shows the times of a flight he has booked on Oceanic Flight 815.
 Google Inbox: The mobile and web app Google Inbox displayed Oceanic Flight 22, SFO-JFK for 4 December, 8:00 AM as an example reminder on first use for web app users.

Comics 
 Alex: Bankers Alex Masterley and Clive Reed appear as the only survivors of an Oceanic Airlines aircrash in the Amazon Rainforest, in Brazil.
 Daredevil: Oceanic Airlines advertises on a cab in the opening page of issue 104.
 Buffy the Vampire Slayer Season 8 had an Oceanic flight lose a wing and almost crash before being saved by one of the major protagonists.

Film 
 Executive Decision (1996): The entire plot happens on Oceanic Airlines Flight 343, a Boeing 747 flying from Athens, Greece to Washington, DC.
 Bridget Jones: The Edge of Reason: Bridget and Daniel Cleaver fly to Thailand on an Oceanic Airlines Flight.
 For Love of the Game (1999): An Oceanic flight is announced over the PA system in the airport lounge near the end of the movie.
 Nowhere to Land (2000 television movie): A Boeing 747-200 from Sydney to LAX flying with a bio-chemical agent bomb programmed to detonate one hour prior to landing.
 Code 11–14 (2003 television movie): an FBI agent searches for a murderer aboard Oceanic Flight 816, a Boeing 747SP bound for Los Angeles from Sydney.
 Survivor (2015): A flight from Heathrow, London to New York carried out by Oceanic Airlines.
 Downsizing (2017): While not explicitly mentioned within the film, some of its props suggest that the flight was meant to be an Oceanic Airlines one during its production.

Radio 
 Cabin Pressure (25 December 2010): In the Christmas special "Molokai", First Officer Richardson accidentally wishes a Shinto-Buddhist controller at Oceanic ATC a merry Christmas.

Television 
 Alias "A Clean Conscience" (27 April 2005): Oceanic's flight to Sydney is briefly mentioned in an announcement when the show's lead character Sydney Bristow is at Los Angeles International Airport. Alias and Lost were both created by J. J. Abrams.
 Castle "In Plane Sight" (27 April 2015): Oceanic Air appears as the airline Richard Castle and his daughter Alexis are on during a flight from New York to London. The air marshal is murdered, and Castle and his daughter must find the killer with the help of the NYPD from the ground.
 Colony "Eleven.Thirteen" (12 January 2017): Maddy looks up her husband's Oceanic Airlines' flight on her tablet which reads "Flight Status Not Available" prior to the Arrival.
 Chuck "Chuck Versus the Helicopter" (1 October 2007): Chuck is viewing a series of photographs when one prompts him to recall the secret information to which he had been exposed by Bryce Larkin. He begins revealing apparently unconnected secrets, including, "Oceanic Flight 815 was shot down by a surface-to-air..."
 Criminal Minds Beyond Borders (12 April 2017): Flight attendant murdered aboard Oceanic flight to Singapore on Flight 815, the same flight number from Lost.
 Crossing Jordan "Conspiracy" (17 March 2003): Jordan and a detective chase down Henry Ross, a man who framed his wife for his faked death, to an airport just before he attempts to use a $30,000 Oceanic Airline open-ended, multi-stop ticket to escape the country. Damon Lindelof, who co-produced this episode, was often a writer and/or producer for this series, as well as Lost.
 Diagnosis Murder Season 4 "Murder in the Air" episode. The episode happens aboard an Oceanic Airlines flight to Switzerland.
 FlashForward "No More Good Days" (24 September 2009): The FBI agents Mark Benford and Demetri Noh are staking out taking photos of a woman, a billboard with the Oceanic Airlines logo can be seen. The tagline states "Perfect Safety Record".
 Flipper "The Ditching" (30 October 1965): Sandy and Flipper's plane Oceanic Flight 17 crashes in the sea.
 Fringe "The Dreamscape" (25 November 2008): When the FBI was checking the apartment of a murdered Massive Dynamic employee, Special Agent Olivia Dunham found an airline ticket from Oceanic Air. The flight destination printed on the ticket was Omaha, Nebraska, and the date of the flight, 22 December. Fringe and Lost were both created by J.J. Abrams.
 " J.A.G." (TV series, S5 - E18, 2000) Harm and Meg are on their way to Korea with Oceanic flight 105
  "Total Drama Action" "The Aftermath: Pt. Four" (10 December 2009) When Chris McLean and Chef Hatchet are at the airport and about to board the plane, the Oceanic Airlines logo can be seen in front of a boarding gate with the flight number being 815, the same flight number as in Lost.
 Futurama "Möbius Dick" (4 August 2011): The aircraft tail, which couldn't be initially found in Lost, is shown to be placed in the fictional Bermuda Tetrahedron.
 The Goldbergs "The President's Fitness Test" (1 April 2014): It ends with Barry outside of the airport to say goodbye to Fanny, which is Erica's pen pal. 
 Grey's Anatomy (season 12 episode 11): Oceanic Airlines is visible as Jackson Avery approaches the check-in desk, and again behind him as he tries to board the flight his wife April has already boarded.
 LAX "Senator's Daughter" (16 April 2006): Advertisements and computers in airport terminals in LAX read "Oceanic Airlines".
 Once Upon A Time "The Stranger" (29 April 2012): A plane with the Oceanic logo is seen flying overhead.
 The Pretender "Flyer" (19 October 1996): When Jarod returns to the junk yard where the retired planes are, you see an Oceanic airplane in the background.
 Pushing Daisies "Pie-lette" (2 October 2007): An Oceanic Airlines advertisement is displayed in the travel agency.
 The Strain (season 3 episode 8): When Dr. Goodweather and Dutch are listening to the Regis Air 753 voice data recorder, they hear JFK air traffic control instructing the pilots: "Regis 753, foxtrot short at four left. Follow the Oceanic 737 to the ramp". The pilot responds, "753, crossing four left, Oceanic in sight. Turning left at foxtrot".
 Transformers: Cybertron "Inferno": The pilot of a military jet fighter identifies himself as, "Oceanic Flight 815, requesting clearance for landing."
 Up All Night "Travel Day" (16 February 2012): Reagan and Chris travel with Amy for the first time. At the airport check-in, the camera pans to Oceanic Airlines, the counter next to the fictitious Pathway Air that the couple was heading to.
 White Collar "Whack-A-Mole" (11 December 2014): The plane targeted by the Pink Panthers is Oceanic Flight 1097 scheduled to land at JFK 3 days later.
 The X-Files "Synchrony" (13 April 1997): Oceanic is on a note in the future guy's hotel room.
 Zero Hour: In promotional material of a magazine named Modern Skeptic-published by a main character- a cover asks, "What really happened to Oceanic Flight 815?", and features a photo of the Island just before it moves.
 The Goldbergs "Lainey Loves Lionel" (10 February 2016): Adam flies on Oceanic to Seattle to see his girlfriend, Dana.
 The Goldbergs "Smother's Day" (4 May 2016): Adam's airplane ticket to space camp has an Oceanic logo.
 The Goldbergs "MTV Spring Break" (4 April 2018): Erica and Barry fly on Oceanic to Fort Lauderdale for MTV Spring Break and to see Pops.
 The Goldbergs "Airplane" (21 October 2020): The family flew Oceanic to Miami.
The Serpent "Episode 7" (1 January 2021): An Oceanic Airlines flight is seen landing at an airport in Paris

Video games 
 Dead Island (2011): After the first boss fight, the player hears a radio dispatch from Oceanic Flight 1012 stating that the plane will land in the jungle. When the player gets to the roof of the building, they can actually see the plane pass by the coast as it prepares to crash in the jungle. The plane has also broken into 3 parts (cockpit, midsection and tail), as did Oceanic 815.
 The Wolf Among Us (2013): An Oceanic Airlines advertisement is displayed on the roof of a taxi.
 Supertuxkart (2015): An advertisement featuring Oceanic Airlines can be seen in the lobby of the island airport and in a stadium.

Reused footage 

In Executive Decision (1996 film), Oceanic Flight 343 from Athens to Washington, D.C. was hijacked by an Islamic terrorist. Stock footage from Executive Decision was reused in the following:
 After the Sunset (2004 film): In the trailer, Max and Lola fly on Oceanic Airlines to their retreat in The Bahamas. The footage does not appear in the film's final cut.
 Category 6: Day of Destruction (2004 miniseries): Oceanic Flight 762 was forced to make an emergency landing at O'Hare International Airport after being struck by lightning. During landing, the hole in the aircraft's fuselage from Executive Decision is visible.
 Diagnosis: Murder episode "Murder in the Air" (24 April 1997): Flying between Los Angeles International Airport and Switzerland on Oceanic Flight 456, Dr Mark Sloan and Amanda Bentley carry out an airborne investigation after the first officer is murdered and several aircrew personnel are incapacitated by a mysterious illness.
 JAG:
 "Vanished" (28 October 1997): An Oceanic Airlines flight to Washington, D.C. carrying a delegation from the Palestine Liberation Organization is the target of a terrorist plot involving a missing United States Navy F-14 Tomcat. Lt. Commander Douglas decides not to shoot it down.
 "The Bridge at Kang So Ri" (29 February 2000): Oceanic Flight 105 is skyjacked by North Korean extremists who accuse a passenger of ordering a massacre during the Korean War.
 Nowhere to Land (2000 television movie): A man suffering from mental illness brings a deadly nerve agent on board Oceanic Flight 762, also from Sydney to Los Angeles, in the run-up to the 2000 Summer Olympics. At takeoff, the hole in the aircraft's fuselage from Executive Decision is visible.
 Panic in the Skies! (1996 television movie): A Royce Air International Boeing 747 is struck by lightning shortly after takeoff in America, en route for Europe. In some scenes, the Royce Air International logo is not visible, with Oceanic Airline markings in their place.
 The War at Home "The West Palm Beach Story" (16 April 2006): A gag about a Middle Eastern man and the threat of airborne terrorism on board an Oceanic Airlines flight is featured.

List of fictional Oceanic Airlines flights

Further reading
 The Wayfarer's Handbook: A Field Guide for the Independent Traveler by Evan S. Rice, Hachette Book Group (2017)
 The Aircraft-Spotter's Film and Television Companion by Simon D. Beck, McFarland & Co (2016)
 "Hollywood's Flight Frights: The Bombs Are Back: Now It's Safe to Scare in the Air" by Greg Morago, Hartford Courant (21 July 2005)

See also 
 Acme Corporation
 Finder-Spyder
 Heisler Beer
 Morley (cigarette)

References

External links 
 Boeing 747-121 at Airliners.net. A photographic history of the Boeing 747 used for ground scenes in the film Executive Decision.
 Boeing 747-269B at Airliners.net. A photographic history of the Boeing 747 used for surface to air scenes in the film Executive Decision.
 Boeing 747-SP at Airliners.net. A photographic history of the Boeing 747 used during the filming of Code 11–14.
 Lockheed L-1011-385-1 TriStar 1 at Airliners.net. A photographic history of the Lockheed L-1011 TriStar dismantled for the set of Lost.

Lost (TV series)
Fictional airlines
In-jokes
Fictional brands
Fictional companies
Oceania in fiction